The 2012 Copa ASOBAL was the 23rd edition of the Copa ASOBAL. It took place in the Pabellón As Travesas, in Vigo, Galicia, on 21 & 22 December 2012. It was hosted by Liga ASOBAL, Vigo city council & Academia Octavio. Vigo hosts Copa ASOBAL for third time. FC Barcelona Intersport won its eight title and qualified for 2013–14 EHF Champions League.

Qualified teams
Qualified teams are the top four teams on standings at midseason.

Venue

Matches

Semifinals

Final

Top goalscorers

See also
Liga ASOBAL 2012–13
Copa del Rey de Balonmano 2012–13

References

External links
Official website

2012–13 in Spanish handball
Copa ASOBAL